The 2021 British Open (officially the 2021 Matchroom.live British Open) was a professional snooker event played from 16 to 22 August 2021 at the Morningside Arena, Leicester, England. It was the 2021 edition of the British Open event, and the first since the 2004 British Open. It was the second ranking event of the 2021–22 snooker season, following the 2021 Championship League and preceding the 2021 Northern Ireland Open. It was broadcast by ITV Sport in the UK, and sponsored by Matchroom Sport. The winner received £100,000 from a total prize pool of £470,000.

All rounds in the tournament were played after a random draw made under a single-elimination tournament format with no seeded players. The first four rounds, from the last 128 to the last 16, were played as best-of-five  matches, the quarter-finals and semi-finals as best-of-seven-frame matches, and the final played as the best-of-eleven frames. John Higgins, the defending champion from 2004, lost 1–3 to Ricky Walden in the third round. Mark Williams defeated Gary Wilson 6–4 in the final to win the 24th ranking title of his career. The event featured 32 century breaks, including two maximum breaks. Higgins made his 12th maximum break in professional competition in the first frame of his first-round win over Alexander Ursenbacher, and Ali Carter made his third maximum break in the second frame of his fourth-round match against Elliot Slessor.

Format
The British Open is a snooker event first held in 1980 as the British Gold Cup. The event changed names to the British Open for the 1985 event won by Silvino Francisco. The 2021 tournament was held from 16 to 22 August 2021 at the Morningside Arena in Leicester, England. It was the first British Open event in 17 years, the last being played in 2004. It was the second ranking event of the 2021–22 snooker season, following the 2021 Championship League, and preceding the Northern Ireland Open. John Higgins was the defending champion, having defeated Stephen Maguire 9–6 in the 2004 final, to win his 16th ranking title. The event was broadcast by ITV4 in the United Kingdom, Eurosport in Europe; Liaoning TV, Superstar online, Kuaishou, Migu, Youku, Zhibo.tv and Huya Live in China; Now TV in Hong Kong; Sports cast in Taiwan; True Sports in Thailand; DAZN in Canada, Astrosport in Australia and by Matchroom Sport in all other territories. Matchroom also sponsored the event.

The event featured all 128 participants from the World Snooker Tour, no seedings, and a random draw after each round. Matches were played as the best-of-five , until the quarter-finals and semi-finals, which were played as best-of-seven-frame matches. The final was a best-of-eleven.

Prize fund 
The tournament had a total prize fund of £470,000, the winner receiving £100,000. A breakdown of prize money for this event is shown below:

 Winner: £100,000
 Runner-up: £45,000
 Semi-final: £20,000
 Quarter-final: £12,000
 Last 16: £7,000
 Last 32: £5,000
 Last 64: £3,000
 Highest break: £5,000
 Total: £470,000

Summary

The first round was played from 16 to 18 August, as the best of five frames. On the first day, defending champion Higgins made his 12th competitive maximum break, in the first frame of his 3–1 win against Alexander Ursenbacher. At 46 years and 90 days, Higgins broke his own record as the oldest man to make a maximum break in competition. He had previously been the oldest player to make one after completing a maximum at the Championship League in October 2020. Higgins became the player with the second most maximum breaks, behind Ronnie O'Sullivan with 15, and now ahead of Stephen Hendry. 

World number one Judd Trump trailed 1–2 to Mitchell Mann, but won 3–2. Despite making two century breaks, Kyren Wilson was defeated by Ashley Hugill 2–3. Mark Allen and Reanne Evans, who had been in a relationship between 2005 and 2008, met in the first round. The players, who had been in legal battles over child maintenance, had their first professional meeting at the event. The finalists of the 2021 World Snooker Championship, Shaun Murphy and Mark Selby met in the first round. World champion Selby won the match 3–2. Four-time winner Hendry met Chris Wakelin in the first round. Hendry won the match 3–2, his first main tournament win since rejoining the tour in 2020 after retiring in 2012. Lukas Kleckers won the final two frames against Masters champion Yan Bingtao to win 3–2.

The second round was played on 18 and 19 August as the best of five frames. The 1997 winner Mark Williams recovered from 0–2 behind to Dominic Dale in a 3–2 victory. Iranian player Hossein Vafaei defeated Allen 3–2, despite having never beaten him in four prior meetings. Stephen Maguire defeated Martin O'Donnell 3–2, but complained about O'Donnell's slow play, who had averaged more than 30 seconds per shot. Ali Carter described playing reigning world champion Selby as a "dream draw", and won the match 3–0. Higgins trailed Cao Yupeng 1–2, but made breaks of 95 and 96 to win the match. Higgins lost the third frame of the match after missing a shot, blaming the  having a stray hair on it. Hendry played Gary Wilson and lost 0–3. Neither player made a break above 50. Wilson called the performance "an embarrassment".

The third and fourth rounds were played on 20 August also as the best of five frames. Trump played Elliot Slessor losing 2–3. The loss meant that Selby would now be ranked as the world number one after the event. Slessor went on to face Carter in the fourth round. Carter made the second maximum break of the event in the second round, but only won that frame, losing 1–3. Ricky Walden completed a 3–1 win over Higgins, and then defeated Ross Muir by the same scoreline. Williams made breaks of 71 and 70 as he defeated Liam Highfield 3–0. Williams played Zhang Jiankang in the fourth round, where he was the sole player from the top 16 remaining. Zhang led 2–1 and was within four  of winning the match, but missed a routine , and eventually lost 2–3. David Gilbert, who had won his first ranking event at the preceding Championship League event, reached the quarter-finals where he drew Wilson, who had defeated Vafaei.

The quarter-finals were played on 21 August as the best of seven frames. Slessor met Zhou Yuelong and won 4–3 to reach his second ranking event semi-final. Williams played Ricky Walden in the quarter-finals. Williams won 4–3 on the final black, despite Walden making four breaks over 50. Williams commented that despite the win, he "couldn't string three pots together", and that the players he had faced in the tournament had lost matches, rather than him winning them. Robertson played Lu Ning in the final quarter-final match, winning 4–2. The semi-finals were contested on 21 August as the best of seven frames. Wilson played Slessor, but trailed 0–2. Wilson won the frame to reach his second ranking final. Williams completed breaks of 60, 73 and 58 in a 4–1 win over Robertson.

The final was played between Williams and Wilson on 22 August as the best of eleven frames. Williams won the opening frame, before Wilson tied the match in frame two. A break of 111 in frame three for Williams was his first century break of the event, before Wilson won frame four. Wilson won frame five with a break of 101 to lead the match for the first time, Williams winning back-to-back frames to lead 4–3. Wilson won frame eight to tie the match, but Williams won the next two frames to complete a 6–4 victory. This was Williams's 24th ranking event title, and his second British Open title, 24 years since he last won the event in 1997. Aged 46, Williams was the third oldest person to win a ranking event, only behind Ray Reardon in 1982 (50) and Doug Mountjoy in 1989 (46). Williams commented that he had been lucky to progress to the final, but that his performance in the final was the best he had played in the tournament. Wilson said he was "bitterly disappointed" not to win.

Tournament draw
The results from the event are shown below; players in bold denote match winners. Kurt Maflin withdrew from the event (denoted by w/d) and his opponent received a walkover (w/o).

Top half

Section 1

Section 2

Section 3

Section 4

Bottom half

Section 5

Section 6

Section 7

Section 8

Finals

Final
The frame scores for the final are shown below. Numbers in brackets show breaks made during that frame.

Century breaks
There were 32 century breaks made during the event. Both Higgins and Carter compiled maximum breaks of 147 during the event. Higgins made one in the first frame of his first-round win over Ursenbacher, while Carter's maximum was completed during the second frame of his fourth-round loss to Slessor.

 147, 107  Ali Carter
 147  John Higgins
 135, 112  David Gilbert
 134  Zhang Anda
 133  Yuan Sijun
 129, 125  Elliot Slessor
 126  Jimmy Robertson
 124, 109  Zhou Yuelong
 121  Hossein Vafaei
 118, 117  Luca Brecel
 118  Barry Hawkins
 117  Michael Holt
 117  Michael White
 115, 111  Mark Williams
 115, 101  Kyren Wilson
 114, 106, 101, 100  Gary Wilson
 111  Lu Ning
 110  Anthony McGill
 108  Wu Yize
 107  Jordan Brown
 104  Ian Burns
 104  Anthony Hamilton

References

External links
 

British Open
2021
British Open
British Open
Sport in Leicester